Jerry Orbach was an American actor of the stage and screen.

For his stage work he received three Tony Award nominations. His first nomination was for Best Featured Actor in a Musical for Guys and Dolls in 1965. He won the Tony Award for Best Actor in a Musical for his performance in Promises, Promises in 1969. He received his third nomination for Best Actor in a Musical for his role in Chicago in 1975. He received a Grammy Award for Album of the Year for Beauty and the Beast (1991).

He received three Primetime Emmy Award nominations for his work on The Golden Girls in 1990, Broadway Bound in 1992 and Law & Order in 2000. He also received nine Screen Actors Guild Award nominations for Outstanding Performance by an Ensemble in a Drama Series for Law and Order. He won for Screen Actors Guild Award for Outstanding Performance by a Male Actor in a Drama Series in 2004. 

For his film performances he received critical attention and nominations for his role in Sidney Lumet's Prince of the City (1981). This includes nominations from the National Society of Film Critics, and the New York Film Critics Circle.

Major associations

Primetime Emmy Awards

Tony Awards

Grammy Awards

Screen Actors Guild Awards

Miscellaneous awards

References 

Lists of awards received by American actor